Cotoneaster microphyllus, the small-leaved cotoneaster or rockspray cotoneaster, is a species of flowering plant in the family Rosaceae. It is native to the Indian Subcontinent, Tibet, Sichuan, and Yunnan in China, and Myanmar, and it has been introduced to various locales in Europe, Australia, and the United States. Care should be taken not to plant it where it can become invasive.

References

microphyllus
Flora of the Indian subcontinent
Flora of Tibet
Flora of South-Central China
Flora of Myanmar
Plants described in 1828